Ali Najem AlQumani (born 25 March 1989) is a Kuwaiti radio personality who is a former producer and director for Marina FM radio station in Kuwait.

Early life
Ali was born on March 25, 1989, in Kuwait. Ali graduated from AlAsmaei high school, in Qortoba. After high school Ali went to university, Gust University and graduated 2012 where he majored in English Translation and Linguistics.

Career
AIi has worked in several shows including, Night show with Eman Najem, Refresh, Jidder w Gha6awi show, El7ajiya wain? (Where is Hajiya?), and Bu Chandal Mino? (Who's Buchandal?).

Blackberry
Starting from October 2012, Ali is Kuwait's official ambassador for Blackberry.

Directed, hosted
Ali directed "Balanty Show" for 3 months which was a Football show. Hosted "Balanty Show" for 2 weeks, and hosted and Directed "Nagham Alsaba7" for 2 weeks.

References

 Gust University for Science and Technology "Abdulwahab Al-Essa, Hind Al-Nahedh & Ali Najim discuss Twitter at GUST", Ali Najim, Kuwait, 31 October 2011. Retrieved on 15 October 2015.

1989 births
Living people